Prestea-Huni Valley Municipal District is one of the fourteen districts in Western Region, Ghana. Originally it was formerly part of the then-larger Wassa West District in 1988, which was created from the former Wassa-Fiase-Mpohor District Council, until the northern part of the district was split off to create Prestea-Huni Valley District on 29 February 2008; thus the remaining part was renamed as Tarkwa-Nsuaem District (which was later elevated to municipal district assembly status on that same year to become Tarkwa-Nsuaem Municipal District). However, on 15 March 2018, it was later elevated to municipal district assembly status by President Nana Addo Dankwah Akuffo-Addo to become Prestea-Huni Valley Municipal District. The municipality is located in the eastern part of Western Region and has Bogoso as its capital town.

Settlements
It has four major towns namely, Prestea, Huni Valley, Aboso and Bogoso. It also has about 29 villages and small-town notable including Damang and Bondaye which are all mining towns.

Education
The municipal has three secondary schools namely, St. Augustine's senior high school, Huni Valley senior high school and Prestea senior high technical school.

Resources
The municipal is rich in gold and cocoa, timber and magnesium.

It also have a historical site at Atwereboana, for the war of nsaman k), and the death place for Sir Guggesberg.

Sources
 
 GhanaDistricts.com

References

Districts of the Western Region (Ghana)